Luiz Fernando Nascimento is a Brazilian footballer who currently plays for Memphis 901 in the USL Championship.

Youth 

Luiz Fernando played for the Sport Club Corinthians Paulista youth academy and played for their U-20 team. He also played briefly for Flamengo.

Professional 

Luiz Fernando signed with the Richmond Kickers on February 23, 2016. On March 26, 2016, Luiz Fernando made his professional debut for the Kickers, coming on for Yudai Imura in the 75th minute, en route to a 3–1 victory over the Harrisburg City Islanders. On May 18, 2016, Luiz Fernando scored his first goal for the Kickers in a U.S. Open Cup fixture against Aromas Café FC, scoring in the 83rd minute of the match en route to a 4–0 victory. Fernando remained a mainstay on the Kickers throughout the 2017 and 2018 seasons, tallying 78 total appearances, scoring 6 goals.

On November 19, 2018, Fernando signed for USL Championship side Atlanta United 2.

Fernando became the first second-team player to sign a first-team contract with Atlanta United on August 21, 2019. Fernando made his Atlanta United debut on February 26, 2020 in a CONCACAF Champions League match against Motagua.

On July 1, 2020 Fernando was waived by Atlanta United which cleared an international roster slot for Mexican winger Jürgen Damm who was signed the same day.

On 30 December 2020, it was announced that Fernando would join USL Championship side Tampa Bay Rowdies ahead of their 2021 season. Following the 2021 season it was announced that Fernando would leave the Rowdies.

On 17 February 2022, Fernando joined USL Championship club Memphis 901 ahead of their 2022 season.

Statistics

References 

1997 births
Living people
Atlanta United 2 players
Atlanta United FC players
Brazilian footballers
Brazilian expatriate footballers
Sport Club Corinthians Paulista players
Memphis 901 FC players
Richmond Kickers players
USL Championship players
Expatriate soccer players in the United States
Brazilian expatriate sportspeople in the United States
Association football midfielders
Tampa Bay Rowdies players